The All-MLB Team is an annual Major League Baseball (MLB) honor given to the best players across both leagues at each position during the season. Selections to the first and second teams are determined by a fan vote and a panel consisting of media members, former players, and baseball officials.

Description
The roster of each team consists of one catcher, four infielders (one for each position), three outfielders regardless of position, one designated hitter, five starting pitchers, and two relief pitchers. Before the 2022 season, the designated hitter had been used only in the American League (as well as interleague games hosted by American League teams), except during the COVID-19-affected 2020 season.

Selections

See also
All-NBA Team, a similar honor for National Basketball Association (NBA) players
All-Pro, a similar honor for National Football League (NFL) players
NHL All-Star team, a similar honor for National Hockey League (NHL) players

References

Major League Baseball trophies and awards
Awards established in 2019